Jagannātha (1590-1670), also known as Jagannātha Paṇḍita or Jagannātha Paṇḍitarāja, or Jagannatha Pandita Rayalu, was a poet and literary critic who lived in the 17th century. As a poet, he is known for writing the Bhāminī-vilāsa ("The Sport of the Beautiful Lady (Bhāminī)"). He was a Telugu Brahmin from Khandrika (Upadrasta) family and a junior contemporary of Emperor Akbar. As a literary theorist or rhetorician, he is known for Rasagaṅgādhara, a work on poetic theory. He was granted the title of Paṇḍitarāja by the Mughal emperor Shah Jahan, at whose court he received patronage.

Career
Jagannātha was a Sanskrit scholar, poet and a musician from Munikhanda Agraharam (present day Munganda), East Godavari District, Andhra Pradesh, India.  He later lived in Varanasi, India. Jagannatha Pandita Raya's contributions were, "Rasa Gangadharam" (Alankara Sastram), Ganga Lahari, and Five Vilasams in Sanskrit language.

He served in the courts of the Mughal emperors Jehangir and Shah Jahan. Some writers say that Jagannath Pandit Raj (as he was called) was born (1590) in a Veginadu Andhra Brahmin family. His father Perubhatt and mother Laxmi both were learned Sanskrit scholars. In his poetry work Rasa Gangadhar Jagannath has named his father as his teacher. His poetic work includes Rasa Gangadhar, Ganga Lahari (also known as Piyush lahari) Kawita kamini, Yamuna lahari, Bhamini Vilas, Vishnu Lahari, Asaph-Lahari etc. Jagannath Pandit was the grandson of Gusainji Vithalnath-Son of Vallabhacharya of Vallabh sampraday (Daughter's Son)

"Ganga Lahari" is a composition of 52 Sanskrit Shlokas by Jagannath Pandit has historic importance. The Great man was accepted as her spiritual guide by princess Lavangika, Daughter of emperor shah jehan and the prince Dara Shukoh was friendly with him to learn more of Sanskrit and Hindu culture. Both these facts were mistaken by the citizens in Delhias an ordinary earthly love story.

The emperor asked Jagannath Pandit to accept Islam as his religion and marry his daughter which was not acceptable to Jagannath. He started fasting on the banks of river ganga and every day he would compose a shloka to pray the godly and motherly river Ganga. On completion of every shloka the waters rose by a step by step for 52 days (Jeshthha shuddha 1 to 10 are the days called "Ganga Dashahara) in Hindu calendar, and at the end, Pandit Raj offered himself into the river and ended his life nobly.(1670) The band of 52 shlokas is available now also with its meaning and is known as a very beautiful piece of poetry of the old times.

The story according to Kirtan Sampraday is a little different. There was a conspiracy to convert Jagannath Pandit to Islam. Jagannath called to play chess with the emperor Shaha Jahan. He introduced him to his daughter and asked him to compose a poem on her beauty. As soon as he did this, the emperor said that since you are so enchanted with her beauty, you marry her. This indirectly meant conversion. The other option was simply to deny the Emperor's order and face death. Jagannath was smart and said that he will abide by the royal wish, however, the wedding would be in accordance to his family rituals. With this intelligent answer and his friends like Dara Shuko, he avoided conversion. The Emperor awarded him one village as wedding gift. However, later when Aurangzeb took over Sultant of Delhi, he gave his option to accept Islam or leave the court. Pandit Jagannath left Delhi and stayed in Varanasi in his final days with his wife Lavangi.

Work 
 Bhaminivilasa - a collection of miscellaneous verses composed on different occasions.
 "Rasa Gangadharam" (Alankara Sastram), 
 Ganga Lahari, 
 Five Vilasams

The Bhāminī-vilāsa
The Bhāminī-vilāsa is divided into four chapters, each called vilāsa, and containing about a hundred verses (in the manner of a śataka). Only two of them, namely the first and the last, have been published. Many of the verses are infused with personal touches serving as the poet's memoirs. The collection is named after the poet's first wife Bhamini whom he had lost at a very young age before he launched into his scholarly career. The number of verses per chapter varies between manuscripts:
 The first, anyokti-vilāsa, contains allegorical (anyokti) stanzas about life in general (nīti). It has 100 to 130 stanzas.
 The second, śṛṅgāra-vilāsa, contains love poems. It has 101 to 184 stanzas.
 The third, karuṇā-vilāsa, contains laments mourning the death of the beautiful lady (Bhāminī).
 The fourth, śānta-vilāsa, contains verses on renunciation (vairagya). It has 31 to 46 stanzas.

Example verses
 From the Rasa-gaṅgādhara

 From the Bhāminī-vilāsa

Devotional poems
He composed five devotional poems, each of whose names contains the word laharī ("a large wave"):
 Amṛta-laharī, in praise of the river Yamunā, 10 stanzas long,
 Sudhā-laharī, in praise of Sūrya the sun god, 30 stanzas long,
 Gaṅgā-laharī, addressed to the river Gaṅgā, 53 stanzas long,
 Karuṇā-laharī, in praise of Kṛṣṇa (Krishna), 60 stanzas long, and
 Lakṣmī-laharī, in praise of the goddess Lakshmi, 40 stanzas long.

As a scholar
Jagannātha was a junior contemporary of Appayya Dīkṣita of whom he wrote disparagingly. He wrote the Kaustubha-khaṇḍana, criticizing Bhaṭṭoji Dīkṣita's Śabda-kaustubha, and Prauḍha-manoramā-khaṇḍana (also called manoramā-kuca-mardana) criticizing the explanations of his Prauḍha-manoramā. Other minor works attributed to him include the Sāra-pradīpikā, a commentary on the Sārasvata Prakriyā or Sārasvata vyākaraṇa, an ancient grammatical work attributed to Narendra.

Popular culture
There is a movie on Jagannatha Pandita Rayalu in Tamil (1946) and Hindi (1950). A Marathi musical drama was also a historic work of Shri Vidyadhar Gokhale in Mumbai in 1960.

There are few more art epics on "jagannath Pandit". A Marathi drama by Shri Vidyadhar Gokhale named "Pandit Raj Jagannath" Famous musical stage show was performed by leading artists Shri Bhalchandra Pendharkar, Prasad Sawkar, Mama Pendse, Chittaranjan Kolhatkar, Chandrakant Gokhale, Master Dattaram and Mangala Sanjhagiri and others under the famous banner of "Lalitkaladarsha" about 50 years back.(9-Oct 1960)

The film Lavangi based on Jagannatha pandita Rayalu was released in 1946

References

Further reading and resources
 
 Gangalahari Stotra. neelakanth publications. 1643,Sadashiv Peth, Pune Maharashtra India.
 Gangalahari stotra with Parady shloka by Waman Pandit. Saddharma prakashan.Thane Maharashtra India.
 Marathi Drama Panditraj Jagannath by Vidyadhar Gokhale.
 A Hindi movie of 1961 also presents some of the Sanskrit shlokas music composed by late shri Vasant Desai.

Sanskrit poets
17th-century Indian poets
1590 births
1670 deaths